The Men's parallel giant slalom competition at the FIS Alpine World Ski Championships 2021 was held on 16 February 2021.

Qualification
The qualification was started at 10:00.

Elimination round

References

Men's parallel giant slalom